Lorenzo 1999 – Capo Horn is the eighth studio album by Italian singer-songwriter Jovanotti, released by Mercury Records on 10 May 1999.

Track listing

Charts and certifications

Charts

Certifications

References

1999 albums
Jovanotti albums
Mercury Records albums
Italian-language albums